Liz Burch (born 18 October 1954) is an Australian actress.

Biography
Her most high-profile roles are in the television series The Flying Doctors as Dr. Chris Randall, and Liz Cameron in Cop Shop. Burch is also known for her role in the Disney TV series Five Mile Creek. Subsequent credits include: Water Rats, Wildside, CrashBurn, All Saints, Ocean Girl, Blue Water High and Above the Law.

Filmography 

FILM

TELEVISION

External links

1954 births
Living people
Australian soap opera actresses
Australian children's television presenters
Australian women television presenters